Robecco may refer to one of the following comuni in northern Italy:

Robecco sul Naviglio, in the province of Milan
Robecco d'Oglio, in the province of Cremona
Robecco Pavese, in the province of Pavia